The Kiai language is a vernacular of a native people in the highlands of the central Espiritu Santo Island, Sanma Province, Republic of Vanuatu.

Name variants 
Another name is Fortsenal. The speakers call their language na vara kiai. Fortsenal (Vorozenale) is one of the villages where the speakers live.

Notes

References 
 Vara Kiai: a Kiai wordlist / Tomas Ludvigson, Auckland [N.Z.] : Dept. of Anthropology, University of Auckland, 1989
 Crowley, Terry. 2000. The Language Situation in Vanuatu.

Espiritu Santo languages
Languages of Vanuatu